Rodney Onslow Dennys,  (1911 – 13 August 1993) was a British foreign service operative and long-serving officer of arms at the College of Arms in London.  During World War II he served in the Intelligence Corps of the British Army.

Career
Dennys joined the Foreign Service in 1937, serving in various intelligence posts, including Cairo and Paris. For his war work in the Middle East, he was appointed an Officer of the Order of the British Empire (OBE) on 14 October 1943. He was granted the honorary rank of lieutenant-colonel on 1 January 1949, and relinquished his commission in 1966, retaining that rank. Dennys joined the staff at the College of Arms in 1958. His first heraldic appointment came on 8 August 1961 when he was appointed Rouge Croix Pursuivant of Arms in Ordinary to replace Walter Verco. He continued in this office until 1967 when he was appointed Somerset Herald of Arms in Ordinary. He held this position until his retirement in 1982, after which he was granted the post of Arundel Herald of Arms Extraordinary. In 1969 he was made a Member (4th Class) of the Royal Victorian Order (MVO), on the occasion of the Investiture of the Prince of Wales, in the 1982 New Year Honours he was promoted to Commander (CVO). In 1983 he was appointed High Sheriff of East Sussex.

Personal life
Dennys's wife, Elizabeth, was a sister of the late Graham Greene. They had one son and two daughters.

Publications
Rodney Dennys. The Heraldic Imagination. New York: Clarkson N. Potter, 1975.
Rodney Dennys. Heraldry and the Heralds. London: Jonathan Cape, 1982 and 1984.

See also
Heraldry
Pursuivant
Herald

References

External links
The College of Arms
CUHAGS Officer of Arms Index
London Gazette notice of appointment as Rouge Croix Pursuivant

1911 births
1993 deaths
Commanders of the Royal Victorian Order
Officers of the Order of the British Empire
English officers of arms
English genealogists
Fellows of the Society of Antiquaries of London
High Sheriffs of Sussex
Intelligence Corps officers